National Remote Sensing Centre (Hindi: राष्ट्रीय सुदूर संवेदन केन्द्र), or NRSC, located in Hyderabad, Telangana is one of the centres of the Indian Space Research Organisation (ISRO). NRSC manages data from aerial and satellite sources.

Finances 
NRSC is mostly financed by State and Central Government funds but also do commercial business by selling satellite images and provide Consultancy to various government, private organisations. According to RTI number: NRESC/R/E/20/00021, revenues and grants values are published for 2014 to 2019 year.

References

External links
 

Indian Space Research Organisation
Space programme of India
Organisations based in Hyderabad, India
Year of establishment missing